HMS Thruster (F131) was a Mark I LST built by Harland and Wolff. Launched in September 1942 and commissioned the following March, she saw service as part of the Allied invasion of Italy.

Design and development

Thruster was the third of the LST Mk.1 class ships which could carry 13 Churchill tanks, 27 other vehicles and 193 men.

Bruiser had only two sister ships, as plans to build more in the United States led instead to a simpler though slower design capable of similar capacity but with a much shallower draught.

Royal Navy service
Thruster took part in the Salerno landing in 1943. In 1944, she was refitted as a  fighter direction ship, for use during the Normandy landings in controlling fighter aircraft by ground-controlled interception. Later in 1944 she took British troops back into Athens in Greece. Trusher was transferred to the Royal Netherlands Navy in 1947.

Royal Netherlands service
She was acquired by the Royal Netherlands Navy in 1947 and renamed HNLMS Pelikaan with the hull number A 830.

See also

References

Amphibious warfare vessels of the Royal Navy
World War II naval ships of the United Kingdom
Ships built in Belfast
1942 ships
Ships built by Harland and Wolff